The Little Boulder River is a river of the Tasman Region of New Zealand's South Island. It flows from its sources within Kahurangi National Park to reach the Aorere River south of Collingwood.

See also
List of rivers of New Zealand

References

Rivers of the Tasman District
Kahurangi National Park
Rivers of New Zealand